Marghesh (also Romanized as Marghash) is a village in Kenevist Rural District, in the Central District of Mashhad County, Razavi Khorasan Province, Iran. At the 2006 census, its population was 16, in 5 families.

References 

Populated places in Mashhad County